Pitkin Corner (formerly Pitkin) is an unincorporated community in West Fork Township, Washington County, Arkansas, United States. It is located on Washington County Road 35 west of the Woolsey Bridge.

A variant name was "Pitkin". A post office called Pitkin was established in 1884, and remained in operation until 1928.

References

Unincorporated communities in Washington County, Arkansas
Unincorporated communities in Arkansas